The Lancer 29 Mark III, also called the Lancer 29-3, is an American sailboat that was designed by C&C Design as a cruiser and first built in 1977. In 1982 the boat was renamed the Lancer 30.

The Lancer 29 Mark III is thought to have been built using the molds for the C&C 30, hence the design credit to C&C Design. There was no Lancer 29 Mark I or II, but the C&C 30 was produced in Mark I and Mark II versions.

The Lancer 29 Mark III is sometimes confused with the unrelated Lancer 29 PS power sailer.

Production
The design was built by Lancer Yachts in the United States from 1977 until 1981, but it is now out of production.

Design
The Lancer 29 Mark III is a recreational keelboat, built predominantly of fiberglass, with wood trim. It has a masthead sloop rig, a raked stem, a plumb transom, a skeg-mounted rudder and a fixed fin keel. It displaces  and carries  of ballast.

It could also be equipped with a small, well-mounted outboard motor.

See also
List of sailing boat types

Related development
C&C 30
Lancer 30 Mark II

References

Keelboats
1970s sailboat type designs
Sailing yachts
Sailboat type designs by C&C Design
Sailboat types built by Lancer Yachts